This article includes information about the 100 most populous incorporated cities, the 100 most populous core-based statistical areas (CBSAs), and the 100 most populous primary statistical areas (PSAs) of the United States and Puerto Rico.  This information is displayed in two tables.  The first table ranks the cities, CBSAs, and PSAs separately by population.  The second table displays the areas in hierarchical order by the most populous PSA, then most populous CBSA, and then most populous city.

As defined by the U.S. Census Bureau, an incorporated place includes a variety of designations, including city, town, village, borough, and municipality.  A few exceptional census-designated places (CDPs) are also included in the Census Bureau's list of incorporated places.

Most recently on December 1, 2009, the United States Office of Management and Budget (OMB) defined 955 core-based statistical areas (CBSAs) for the United States and Puerto Rico.  The OMB defines a core-based statistical area as one or more adjacent counties or county equivalents that have at least one urban core area of at least 10,000 population, plus adjacent territory that has a high degree of social and economic integration with the core as measured by commuting ties.  The core-based statistical areas currently defined by the OMB include the 374 metropolitan statistical areas (MSAs), which have an urban core population of at least 50,000, and the 581 micropolitan statistical areas (μSAs), which have an urban core population of at least 10,000 but less than 50,000.

Most recently on December 1, 2009, the United States Office of Management and Budget also defined 125 combined statistical areas (CSAs) for the United States and 3 CSAs for Puerto Rico.  The OMB defines a combined statistical area as two or more adjacent core-based statistical areas that have substantial employment interchange.  The CBSAs that combine to create a CSA retain their separate identities within the larger CSA.  

A primary statistical area is a single or multiple core-based statistical area that is not a component of a larger statistical area.  The United States Office of Management and the Budget currently does not use the term "primary statistical area."  Currently, the United States and Puerto Rico have 725 primary statistical areas comprising all 128 combined statistical areas (CSAs) plus the 188 metropolitan statistical areas (MSAs) and 409 micropolitan statistical areas (μSAs) that are not a component of a CSA.


Rank table

The sortable table below displays three lists:
A list of the 100 most populous incorporated cities of the United States,
A list of the 100 most populous core-based statistical areas (CBSAs) of the United States and Puerto Rico, and
A list of the 100 most populous primary statistical areas (PSAs) of the United States and Puerto Rico.
The table contains the following information:
The city rank by population as of July 1, 2011, as estimated by the United States Census Bureau
The city and state
The city population as of July 1, 2011, as estimated by the United States Census Bureau
The CBSA rank by population as of July 1, 2011, as estimated by the United States Census Bureau
The CBSA name as defined by the United States Office of Management and Budget
The CBSA population as of July 1, 2011, as estimated by the United States Census Bureau
The PSA rank by population as of July 1, 2011, as estimated by the United States Census Bureau
The PSA name as defined by the United States Office of Management and Budget
The PSA population as of July 1, 2011, as estimated by the United States Census Bureau

Hierarchical table
The sortable table below displays the 100 most populous primary statistical areas (PSAs), the 100 most populous core-based statistical areas (CBSAs), and the 100 most populous incorporated cities of the United States and Puerto Rico with the following information:
The PSA rank by population as of July 1, 2011, as estimated by the United States Census Bureau
The PSA name as defined by the United States Office of Management and Budget
The PSA population as of July 1, 2011, as estimated by the United States Census Bureau
The CBSA rank by population as of July 1, 2011, as estimated by the United States Census Bureau
The CBSA name as defined by the United States Office of Management and Budget
The CBSA population as of July 1, 2011, as estimated by the United States Census Bureau
The city rank by population as of July 1, 2011, as estimated by the United States Census Bureau
The city and state
The city population as of July 1, 2011, as estimated by the United States Census Bureau

Please note:  This table does not include less populous primary statistical areas, less populous constituent core-based statistical areas of combined statistical areas, and less populous incorporated cities in core-based statistical areas.

See also

United States of America
Outline of the United States
Index of United States-related articles

Demographics of the United States
United States Census Bureau
List of U.S. states and territories by population
List of metropolitan areas of the United States
List of United States cities by population
List of United States counties and county-equivalents
Cities and metropolitan areas of the United States
United States Office of Management and Budget
Statistical area (United States)
Combined statistical area (list)
Core-based statistical area (list)
Metropolitan statistical area (list)
Micropolitan statistical area (list)

References

External links

United States Government
United States Census Bureau
2010 United States Census
USCB population estimates
United States Office of Management and Budget

 
 
Demographics of the United States
 
 
United States demography-related lists